The Del Monte Italian Cup 2022–23 is the 45th edition of the tournament. The tournament is divided into two phases. Quarter finals started from 28 to 29 December 2022 while Final four will start on 25 to 26 February 2023. After eleven years, the Final four returns to Roma at the PalaEur.

Format
The top eight teams of Leg 1 from Regular season to take part in a knockout phase with the better ranked team as home teams.

Teams
Ranking is based on the end of fist leg as of 11 December 2022.

Tournament
 All times are local, CET (UTC+01:00).

Quarterfinals
|}

Semifinals
|}

Final
|}

Final standings

See also
2022–23 SuperLega
Super Cup 2022

References

External links
Competition page

Italian Cup
Italian Cup
Italy
Italian Cup
Italian Cup
Men's volleyball competitions in Italy